Binomial may refer to:

In mathematics
Binomial (polynomial), a polynomial with two terms
Binomial coefficient, numbers appearing in the expansions of powers of binomials
Binomial QMF, a perfect-reconstruction orthogonal wavelet decomposition
Binomial theorem, a theorem about powers of binomials
Binomial type, a property of sequences of polynomials

In probability and statistics
Binomial distribution, a type of probability distribution
Binomial process
Binomial test, a test of significance

In computing science
Binomial heap, a data structure

In linguistics
Binomial pair, a sequence of two or more words or phrases in the same grammatical category, having some semantic relationship and joined by some syntactic device

In biology
 Binomial nomenclature, a Latin two-term name for a species, such as Sequoia sempervirens

In finance
Binomial options pricing model, a numerical method for the valuation of options

In politics
Binomial voting system, a voting system used in the parliamentary elections of Chile between 1989 and 2013

See also
List of factorial and binomial topics